Per Holmström (13 February 1901 – 27 January 1982) was a Swedish swimmer. He competed in the men's 100 metre backstroke event at the 1920 Summer Olympics.

References

External links
 

1901 births
1982 deaths
Olympic swimmers of Sweden
Swimmers at the 1920 Summer Olympics
Swimmers from Gothenburg
Swedish male backstroke swimmers
20th-century Swedish people